Aya Tekla Church (Hagia Thékla), also known as Aya Thecla or Aya Thekla, is a ruined historic church of the Byzantine period in Turkey. It was a popular pilgrimage site, and still attracts visitors today.

Location 

History
Thecla (Thékla) was a saint of the early Christian Church, and a reported follower of Paul the Apostle. She enjoyed great popularity in the Byzantine period. According to the main work about her, Acts of Paul and Thecla, she was originally from Iconion, modern Konya, and after the episodes described in the book, she lived around Silifke and died there.

The beginnings of the site are unclear. A site of Thecla's cult near Silifke was visited by Gregory of Nazianzus in 374. Egeria, a woman widely regarded to be the author of a detailed account of a pilgrimage to the Holy Land, visited the site in 384. She mentioned numerous monastic cells for men and women, and a central church with an enclosing wall. The shrine of Thecla was relocated to a hill, now called Meryemlik, meaning "of Virgin Mary", into a cave, which was supposedly Thecla's home in her later years. The grave in the cave supposedly belongs to her.

Up to 312, Thecla's cave was a secret pilgrimage site. At some date, a church was built into the cave. Aya Thekla, the more prominent church, was built on the hilltop in 460–470 by the Byzantine emperor Zeno the Isaurian (reigned 474–475). The church and other related buildings, such as a bath, are now in ruins, the only standing element being a part of the apse. The cave and cistern to the north of the cave are also partially standing.

References

Further reading
 Stephen J. Davis (2008). The Cult of Saint Thecla: A Tradition of Women's Piety in Late Antiquity (Oxford Early Christian Studies).

External links 

Official page of the church

5th-century churches
Ruined churches in Turkey
Byzantine church buildings in Turkey
Archaeological sites in Mersin Province, Turkey
Silifke District
Cave churches